Kjersti Scheen (born 17 August 1943) is a Norwegian journalist, illustrator, novelist, crime fiction writer and children's writer. She made her literary debut in 1976 with the children's book Fie og mørket.  Her novel Teppefall from 1994 introduced a series of crime novels with ex actress "Margaret Moss" as the main character. Scheen was awarded the Gyldendal's Endowment in 1994 (shared with Bjørn Aamodt).

Many of her books have been translated into other languages.

Selected works
Vårmåne (1986)
Teppefall (1994) 
Ingen applaus for morderen (1996) 
Englemakerne (1998) 
Den syvende synd (2000)
Lik i lasta (2003)
Ute av bildet (2006)

References

 

1943 births
Living people
Artists from Oslo
Oslo National Academy of the Arts alumni
20th-century Norwegian novelists
21st-century Norwegian novelists
Norwegian children's writers
Norwegian illustrators
Norwegian women illustrators
Norwegian crime fiction writers
Norwegian journalists
Norwegian women novelists
Writers from Oslo
Norwegian women children's writers
21st-century Norwegian women writers
20th-century Norwegian women writers
Women crime writers